Radíč is a municipality and village in Příbram District in the Central Bohemian Region of the Czech Republic. It has about 200 inhabitants.

Administrative parts
Villages of Dubliny, Hrazany and Žďár are administrative parts of Radíč.

Gallery

References

Villages in Příbram District